Temperate coniferous forest is a terrestrial biome defined by the World Wide Fund for Nature. Temperate coniferous forests are found predominantly in areas with warm summers and cool winters, and vary in their kinds of plant life. In some, needleleaf trees dominate, while others are home primarily to broadleaf evergreen trees or a mix of both tree types.  A separate habitat type, the tropical coniferous forests, occurs in more tropical climates.

Temperate coniferous forests are common in the coastal areas of regions that have mild winters and heavy rainfall, or inland in drier climates or montane areas. Many species of trees inhabit these forests including pine, cedar, fir, and redwood. The understory also contains a wide variety of herbaceous and shrub species. Temperate coniferous forests sustain the highest levels of biomass in any terrestrial ecosystem and are notable for trees of massive proportions in temperate rainforest regions.

Structurally, these forests are rather simple, consisting of 2 layers generally: an overstory and understory. However, some forests may support a layer of shrubs. Pine forests support an herbaceous ground layer that may be dominated by grasses and forbs that lend themselves to ecologically important wildfires. In contrast, the moist conditions found in temperate rain forests favor the dominance by ferns and some forbs.

Forest communities dominated by huge trees (e.g., giant sequoia, Sequoiadendron gigantea; redwood, Sequoia sempervirens), unusual ecological phenomena, occur in western North America, southwestern South America, as well as in the Australasian region in such areas as southeastern Australia and northern New Zealand.

The Klamath-Siskiyou ecoregion of western North America harbors diverse and unusual assemblages and displays notable endemism for a number of plant and animal taxa.

Ecoregions

Eurasia

North America

See also

 Cedar hemlock douglas-fir forest
 Temperate deciduous forest

References

External links

Temperate forest

 
 Terrestrial biomes
Conifers
Forests
Biomes
Montane forests